Genc Mehmeti (born 4 November 1980) is a Swiss footballer who plays for FC Emmenbrücke.

External links

AC Bellinzona profile 

1980 births
Living people
Swiss men's footballers
FC Schaffhausen players
FC Luzern players
AC Bellinzona players
FC Wil players
FC Baden players
SC Kriens players
Swiss Challenge League players
Swiss Super League players
Association football midfielders
Swiss people of Kosovan descent